Investor AB is a Swedish investment and de facto conglomerate holding company. It was founded in 1916 and is still controlled by the Wallenberg family through their Foundation Asset Management company FAM. The company owns a controlling stake in several large Swedish companies, with smaller positions in a number of other firms.

History
Investor AB was established in Stockholm in when new Swedish legislation made it more difficult for banks to own stocks in industrial companies on a long-term basis. The shareholdings of the family bank, Stockholms Enskilda Bank (SEB), were transferred to Investor AB, a newly formed industrial holding company spun off from the bank.

Investments

Listed companies
Investor AB has the controlling interest of the following companies: 
 ABB - Provides electrification products, robotics and motion, industrial automation and power grids.
 AstraZeneca - A biopharmaceutical company.
 Atlas Copco - Provides compressors, vacuum and air treatment systems, construction equipment, power tools, and assembly systems.
 Electrolux - Provides household appliances for consumer use.
 Electrolux Professional - food service, beverage and laundry for professional use, spun off from Electrolux AB in 2020.
 Epiroc - mining, infrastructure and natural resources.
 Ericsson - Provides communications technology and services.
 Husqvarna AB - Provides outdoor power products, consumer watering products, cutting equipment, and diamond tools.
 Nasdaq, Inc. - Provides financial services and controls stock exchanges
 Saab - Products for military defense and civil security.
 SEB - A financial services group focusing mainly on the Nordic countries, Germany, and the Baltics.
 Sobi - Biopharmaceutics
 Wärtsilä - marine and power engine development.

Patricia Industries 
Patricia Industries' key focus is to invest in and develop wholly-owned companies. 
BraunAbility - automotive mobility products
Laborie - Develops, designs, and distributes innovative capital equipment for the urology and gastroenterology sectors, with complementing and recurring high-volume sales of disposable catheters
Mölnlycke Health Care - Designs, manufactures, and supplies single use products for managing wounds
Permobil - powered and manual wheelchairs, as well as cushions and accessories
Piab - A provider of gripping and moving for automated manufacturing and logistics processes
Sarnova - A provider of healthcare products to emergency care providers, hospitals, schools, businesses, and federal government agencies
Advanced Instruments - osmolality testing instrumentation and consumables for the clinical, biopharmaceutical, and food & beverage markets
Vectura - Develops, owns and manages real estate
3 Scandinavia - Provides mobile voice and broadband services in Sweden and Denmark
Financial Investments - Financial Investments consist of investments in which the investment horizon has not yet been defined

Investments in EQT
Investments in EQT AB and EQT Funds.
 EQT Partners - EQT manages and advises a range of specialized investment funds, and other investment vehicles that invest across the world with the mission to generate attractive returns and future-proof companies. As one of EQT's founders in 1994, Investor has invested in most of its funds.

Executives
  - CEO from 2015 to present, member of the Management Group since 2006
 Helena Saxon - CFO, member of the Management Group since 2015
 Petra Hedengran - General Counsel, Head of Corporate Governance and responsible for investments in EQT funds, member of the Management Group since 2007
 Daniel Nodhäll - Head of Listed Companies, member of the Management Group since 2015
 Viveka Hirdman-Ryrberg - Head of Corporate Communication & Sustainability, member of the Management Group since 2018
 Christian Cederholm - Head of Patricia Industries, member of the Extended Management Group since 2017
 Jessica Häggström - Head of HR, member of the Extended Management Group since 2017

See also

Some former holdings
 IBX - purchasing services (sold to Capgemini in 2010)
 WM-data - IT services (sold in August 2006)
 Saab Automobile - acquired by General Motors
 Scania - divested its holding to Volkswagen AG in 2008
 Bredbandsbolaget (BBB) - a broadband and telecoms provider. This was initially difficult but sold in 2005 to Telenor for a profit.
 OMX - financial services company (sold in May 2007 to Nasdaq, Inc.)

Other Swedish investment companies
Ratos
Investment AB Kinnevik
Investment AB Latour
L E Lundbergföretagen AB
Aktiebolaget Industrivärden

References

External links
Yahoo! - Investor AB company profile

Swedish companies established in 1916
Companies based in Stockholm
Companies listed on Nasdaq Stockholm
Companies related to the Wallenberg family
Financial services companies established in 1916
Investment companies of Sweden